Mr. Flamboyant  is a six track EP, by American rapper E-40. It was released by Sick Wid It Records on May 14, 1991 on LP's and cassettes. The album features production by B-Legit, D-Shot and E-40.

Track listing
"Mr Flamboyant" - 5:53
"Tanji" - 1:33
"Club Hoppin'" - 4:44
"Shut It Down" - 3:39
"Tanji" (instrumental) - 1:31
"Club Hoppin'" (instrumental) - 4:43

External links 
 Mr. Flamboyant at Discogs

E-40 albums
1991 EPs
Self-released albums
Sick Wid It Records EPs